Glossodoris andersonae is a species of sea slug, a dorid nudibranch, a shell-less marine gastropod mollusk in the family Chromodorididae.

Distribution 
The type locality for this species is Abulad Islands, Saudi Arabia, Red Sea, .

Description
Previously confused with Glossodoris cincta this species is distinguished by details of colouring and internal anatomy as well as DNA sequences from other species of very similar appearance.

References

Chromodorididae
Gastropods described in 2018